The Virginia Tech Hokies college football team represents Virginia Tech in the Football Bowl Subdivision (FBS) of the National Collegiate Athletic Association (NCAA) and the Coastal Division of the Atlantic Coast Conference (ACC).  The program has had 33 head coaches, and 1 interim head coach, since it began play during the 1892 season.

History 
 As of the 2017–18 season, the team has played more than 1,250 games in 125 years under 34 different head coaches.
 Five head coaches have led the Hokies in postseason bowl games: Jimmy Kitts, Jerry Claiborne, Bill Dooley, Frank Beamer and Justin Fuente. 
 Two coaches have won conference championships: Jerry Claiborne, in the Southern Conference in 1963 and Frank Beamer with seven, three in the Big East Conference and four in the ACC. 
 Frank Beamer leads in seasons and games coached and wins, with 280 victories in 427 games in 29 seasons. He was the winningest active coach and longest tenured coach in Division I FBS at the time of his retirement in 2015. 
 A. B. Morrison, Jr. has the highest winning percentage (.857) and Robert McNeish has the lowest winning percentage (.086). 
 Andy Gustafson and Jerry Claiborne have been inducted into the College Football Hall of Fame.

Key

List of head coaches

Notes

References 

General

 Lazenby, Roland. Legends: A Pictorial History of Virginia Tech Football. Taylor, Full Court Press (1986) 
 Tandler, Rich. Hokie Games: Virginia Tech Football Game by Game 1945–2006. Game by Game Sports Media (September 15, 2007) 

Specific

External links
 

Lists of college football head coaches

Virginia Tech Hokies football coaches